Undulambia is a genus of moths of the family Crambidae.

Species
Undulambia albitessellalis
Undulambia arnoulalis
Undulambia asaphalis
Undulambia cantiusalis (Schaus, 1924)
Undulambia cymialis (Hampson, 1907)
Undulambia dendalis
Undulambia electrale (Dyar, 1914)
Undulambia flavicostalis
Undulambia fovecosta
Undulambia fulvicolor
Undulambia fulvitinctalis (Hampson, 1897)
Undulambia grisealis (Hampson, 1906)
Undulambia hemigrammalis
Undulambia intortalis
Undulambia jonesalis
Undulambia leucocymalis (Hampson, 1906)
Undulambia leucostictalis
Undulambia lindbladi B. Landry in Landry & Roque-Albelo, 2006
Undulambia marconalis
Undulambia niveiplagalis (Hampson, 1917)
Undulambia oedizonalis (Hampson, 1906)
Undulambia perornatalis (Schaus, 1912)
Undulambia phaeochroalis (Hampson, 1906)
Undulambia polystichalis
Undulambia rarissima Munroe, 1972
Undulambia semilunalis
Undulambia striatalis (Dyar, 1906)
Undulambia symphorasalis (Schaus, 1924)
Undulambia tigrinale
Undulambia vitrinalis (C. Felder, R. Felder & Rogenhofer, 1875)

References

Crambidae genus list at Butterflies and Moths of the World of the Natural History Museum

Musotiminae
Crambidae genera